The real (plural: reales) was the currency of Venezuela until 1843.

History
Until 1821, the Spanish colonial real circulated in Venezuela. On 12 June 1802, a mint was opened in Caracas and issued coins denominated in reales until 1821. Paper money was introduced in 1811 denominated in pesos. The Colombian real circulated in Venezuela from 1821, with some coins struck in Caracas. In 1837, the Colombian real was replaced by the Colombian peso (subdivided into 8 reales), which was itself replaced by the Venezuelan peso (subdivided into 10 reales) in 1842 (though it would take a year for the new coins to enter circulation, replacing the 1820s reales). The "real" moniker would continue to be used as a subdivision of the peso until 1863 when the last coin bearing "real" was struck.

Coins
From 1802, copper  and  real coins were issued. Silver 1 and 2 reales followed in 1810. In 1812, the Republican government issued copper  and  real and silver  and 1 real. From 1813, the provinces of Guayana and Maracaibo issued copper  and  real coins. The Royalists issued silver 1, 2 and 4 reales between 1817 and 1821. During the period Venezuela was part of Gran Colombia, silver  real coins were struck at Caracas.

References

History of Venezuela
Modern obsolete currencies
1837 disestablishments
Currencies of Venezuela